Storm Queen was a notable Australian thoroughbred racehorse.

A bay daughter of Coronation Boy from the mare Storm Gleam, she was foaled in 1963 and was trained throughout her career by Bart Cummings.

Her racetrack debut ended in defeat, but it was followed by eight successive wins in her two-year-old season including victory in the 1966 STC Golden Slipper Stakes.

Retired in 1967 following an unplaced run in the AJC Doncaster Handicap she was unable to match her deeds on the racetrack as a breeding mare.

Race record
20 starts - 13 wins, 2 seconds, 1 third

Prize money
A£50,243

Major wins 
Storm Queen won the following major races:
 1966 SAJC Bloodhorse Breeders’ Stakes – (6f)
 1966 VATC Merson Cooper Stakes – (6f)
 1966 VRC Sires’ Produce Stakes – (7f)
 1966 STC Golden Slipper Stakes – (6f)
 1966 AJC Champagne Stakes – (6f)
 1966 MVRC Moonee Valley Stakes – (1m)
 1966 VRC Edward Maniford Stakes – (1m)
 1966 VATC Caulfield Guineas – (1m)
 1966 VRC George Adams Handicap – (1m)
 1967 VRC Lightning Stakes – (5f)

References

1963 racehorse births
Thoroughbred family 5-d
Racehorses bred in Australia
Racehorses trained in Australia